The Orinoco Delta swamp forests (NT0147) is an ecoregion of eastern Venezuela and northern Guyana covering the large and shifting Orinoco Delta.
The vegetation is mostly permanently flooded rainforest. 
The ecoregion is relatively intact apart from a large area that was damaged by a failed flood control program in the 1960s.
It is inaccessible, so logging is difficult, and the soil is unsuitable for farming.
The main threat comes from oil exploration, which would bring an influx of settlers into the delta.

Location
The Orinoco Delta swamp forests in the lower delta plain of the Orinoco River are one of Earth's largest intact areas of wetlands. 
The forests extend from the base of the Paria Peninsula in the northeast of Venezuela south across the Orinoco Delta floodplain to the Waini River of Guyana.

The ecoregion is bounded on the Gulf of Paria and the Atlantic Ocean by stretches of Amazon-Orinoco-Southern Caribbean mangroves. 
It contains sections of Orinoco wetlands.
To the northwest it adjoins the La Costa xeric shrublands.
To the west it adjoins the Llanos and to the south it adjoins the Guianan moist forests.

Physical

The soils are alluvial deposits carried by rivers from the Andes of Colombia and Venezuela.
The Orinoco fans out into large and small distributaries in the delta, which wind through a landscape of permanent wetlands and marshes, oxbow lakes and levees.

Climate

The Köppen climate classification is "Af": equatorial, fully humid.
A wet season generally lasts from April/May to December.
At a sample location at coordinates  the temperature is relatively stable throughout the year, slightly cooler in January and July and slightly warmer in May and October.

Ecology
The Orinoco Delta swamp forests  are in the Tropical and subtropical moist broadleaf forests biome.
The ecoregion is part of the Guianan Moist Forests Global Ecoregion, which also includes the Guianan moist forests and the Paramaribo swamp forests.

Flora

The Orinoco delta is largely covered by permanently flooded tropical ombrophilous swamp forest, which support various endemic species of plants, with areas of wetlands, mangroves and terra firma rainforest.
Most of the vegetation consists of hydrophilous trees and palms, with many epiphytes and scattered herbaceous plants. 
Hardwood trees include Carapa guianensis, Ceiba pentandra, Dimorphandra excelsa, Hirtella triandra, Inga punctata, Manilkara bidentata, Chlorocardium rodiei, Pentaclethra macroloba, Pterocarpus officinalis, Symphonia globulifera and  Terminalia obovata. Palms, often growing in stands of one species, include Astrocaryum aculeatum, açaí palm (Euterpe oleracea), Manicaria saccifera and Mauritia flexuosa.

Fauna

The swamp forests are home to species that include Orinoco crocodile (Crocodylus intermedius), Amazon river dolphin (Inia geoffrensis), jaguar (Panthera onca), bush dog (Speothos venaticus), giant otter (Pteronura brasiliensis), Orinoco goose (Neochen jubata) and harpy eagle (Harpia harpyja).
Endangered species include the Orinoco crocodile, giant otter and yellow-bellied seedeater (Sporophila nigricollis).

Status

The World Wildlife Fund classes the ecoregion as "Relatively Stable/Intact".
A flood control program in the 1960s dammed the Caño Manamo, which reduced water levels in the upper delta.
This part of the delta became tidal and much more saline than before, with a drastic impact on the flora and fauna.
Otherwise the swamp forests are mostly intact.

The highest risk now comes from oil exploration, which would bring more people into the region and cause forest clearance for food and building materials.
The way of life of the indigenous Warao people would be disturbed by the newcomers.
In some areas the açaí (Euterpe oleracea) and moriche (Mauritia flexuosa) palm trees are over-exploited. Although the region is largely inaccessible, there is growing concern about logging. The cleared land is poor quality and cannot support farming.

There are two indigenous reserves, which do not provide much protection, and several conservation units.
The  Delta del Orinoco Biosphere Reserve is a sustainable use unit. Part of it covers wetlands.
The  Imataca Forest Reserve is another sustainable use unit with a portion that covers the eastern coastal wetlands.
National parks in Venezuela are fully protected, and cover parts of the wetlands and surrounding ecoregions.
They include the  Delta del Orinoco National Park, the  Turuépano National Park in the north of the ecoregion and the  Mariusa National Park that protects wetlands along the Caño Macareo.

References

Sources

 

Ecoregions of Venezuela
Ecoregions of Guyana
Neotropical tropical and subtropical moist broadleaf forests